Brendan Murphy (born 1980) is an Irish sportsperson.  He plays hurling with his local club Ballyskenagh  and has been a member of the Offaly senior inter-county team  since 2000. He won 2 Division 2 Hurling Leagues, 1 Leinster u 21 title, 2 Railway Cup Medals , 3 Dublin Championships and 1 Fitzgibbon Cup. He was nominated for Young Hurler of the Year in 2000 and an Allstar in 2003. He captained Offaly in 2006.  On 2 November 2012, Murphy retired from inter-county GAA.

References

 

1980 births
Living people
Ballyskenagh hurlers
Offaly inter-county hurlers
Leinster inter-provincial hurlers